The Zhaney, or Jane, were one of the twelve major Circassian tribes, representing one of the twelve stars on the green-and-gold Circassian flag.

History
The Zhaney were a very powerful Circassian tribe in the past. They lived the north of the Natukhai tribe's land on the coast of the Black Sea and Azov Sea in Eastern Europe. A map of the 17th century also shows they lived right by the coast of the lower flow of Kubans, beyond Taman and Atchu. As a result of the bloody Russian–Circassian War, Zhaney tribe was almost wholly destroyed, as only 3 families survived.

See also
 Other Circassian tribes:
 Abzakh
 Besleney
 Bzhedug
 Hatuqwai
 Kabardian
 Mamkhegh
 Natukhai
 Shapsug
 Temirgoy
 Ubykh
 Yegeruqwai

References

Circassians
Circassian tribes
History of Kuban
Historical ethnic groups of Russia